Françoise Gignoux (22 February 1923 – 24 October 1996) was a French alpine skier who competed in the 1948 Winter Olympics.

References

1923 births
1996 deaths
French male alpine skiers
Olympic alpine skiers of France
Alpine skiers at the 1948 Winter Olympics
20th-century French people